Amusa Shittu (1937 – 13 March 2012) was a Nigerian international footballer.

Career
Born in Jos, Shittu played club football for Plateau United, Northern Region XI and ECN.

He made his international debut for Nigeria in 1960, appearing in FIFA World Cup qualifying matches. He also appeared in Olympics qualifying matches.

References

1937 births
2012 deaths
Nigerian footballers
Nigeria international footballers
NEPA Lagos players
Sportspeople from Jos

Association footballers not categorized by position